King Mu may refer to these monarchs:

King Mu of Zhou (died 922 BC)
King Mu of Chu (died 614 BC)
Mu of Baekje (580–641), king of Baekje

See also
Duke Mu (disambiguation)